The Regional Council of Occitania is the deliberative assembly of the region of Occitania, the southernmost administrative region of metropolitan France excluding Corsica. Carole Delga of Socialist Party is the current president of the regional council, elected on 4 January 2016, following the regional elections on 6 and 13 December 2015.

Presidents

2021 elections

References

External links 
Official website of the Occitanie region 

Occitania (administrative region)
Occitania
Occitania